The February 1982 Irish general election to the 23rd Dáil was held on Thursday, 18 February, three weeks after the dissolution of the 22nd Dáil on 27 January by President Patrick Hillery on the request of Taoiseach Garret FitzGerald on the defeat of the government's budget. The general election took place in 41 Dáil constituencies throughout Ireland for 166 seats in Dáil Éireann, the house of representatives of the Oireachtas.

The 23rd Dáil met at Leinster House on 9 March to nominate the Taoiseach for appointment by the president and to approve the appointment of a new government of Ireland. Charles Haughey was appointed Taoiseach, forming the 19th Government of Ireland, a minority single-party Fianna Fáil government.

Campaign

The first general election of 1982 was caused by the sudden collapse of the Fine Gael–Labour Party coalition government when the budget was defeated. The Minister for Finance, John Bruton, attempted to put VAT on children's shoes. This measure was rejected by Jim Kemmy, a left-wing independent Teachta Dála, and Joe Sherlock of Sinn Féin The Workers' Party. The Taoiseach Garret FitzGerald immediately sought a dissolution of the Dáil. However, while he was with President Patrick Hillery at Áras an Uachtaráin, a number of Fianna Fáil members attempted to telephone the president, urging him not to grant a dissolution. If the president refused a dissolution, FitzGerald would have to resign and the Dáil would have an opportunity to nominate a new Taoiseach – with Haughey hoping to re-enter office. The attempt to contact the President was highly unconstitutional, as the President can only take advice from the Taoiseach. In the event, a dissolution was granted and the general election campaign began.

The campaign was largely fought on economic issues. Spending cuts were a reality for whatever party won, but the scale of the cuts were played down by all parties. Fine Gael proposed to continue the policies that it had been implementing while in office. The Fianna Fáil leader Charles Haughey dismissed the need for budget cuts when the campaign first began; however, the need for realism soon became apparent, and the party adopted similar policies that involved budget cuts.

Result

|}
Independents include Independent Fianna Fáil (11,732 votes, 1 seat).

Voting summary

Seats summary

Government formation
Fianna Fáil formed the 18th Government of Ireland, a minority government.

Fianna Fáil emerged as the largest party and looked most likely to form a government. However, internal divisions within the party threatened Charles Haughey's nomination for Taoiseach. In the end a leadership challenge did not take place, and Haughey was the party's nominee for Taoiseach. Haughey gained the support of the Independent Socialist TD Tony Gregory, the Independent Fianna Fáil TD Neil Blaney and the three Sinn Féin the Workers' Party deputies, and was appointed Taoiseach.

Dáil membership changes
The following changes took place as a result of the election:
7 outgoing TDs retired
1 vacant seat at election time
157 outgoing TDs stood for re-election (also John O'Connell, the outgoing Ceann Comhairle, who was automatically returned)
136 of those were re-elected
21 failed to be re-elected
29 successor TDs were elected
21 were elected for the first time
8 had previously been TDs
There was 1 successor female TD, who replaced 4 outgoing; thus the total decreased by 3 to 8.
There were changes in 26 of 41 constituencies

Where more than one change took place in a constituency the concept of successor is an approximation for presentation only.

See also
Members of the 16th Seanad

Notes

References

External links
February 1982 election: Party leaders' debate RTÉ archives

Further reading

General election, 1982a
1982 in Irish politics
General elections in the Republic of Ireland
23rd Dáil
February 1982 events in Europe